Shilin Yi Autonomous County (: Sani) is an autonomous county, under the jurisdiction of Kunming, the capital of Yunnan province, China.

Etymology

Lunan Yi Autonomous County is the former name of Shilin, and usually be called for short as Lunan County. The name of "Lunan" was first appeared in 1275, Yuan Dynasty, when the administrative division of Lunan Zhou established. The name Lunan means "South of Middle Lu". But in 1998, another said of the word's origin meaning was proposed when Lunan County apply for change the name to Shilin. The research shows "Lunan" means "South People (the most inferior people in Yuan Dynasty citizen system) in Chengjiang Lu", it is a discriminatory name. Finally Lunan County was changed the name to Shilin, which means "stone forest", also is a famous tourist site in the county.

History
Archaeological research show that as early as 800,000 years ago, humans began to settle in this region. Shilin area was dominated by Liangzhou in Shang Dynasty, and was governed by Chu Kingdom and Dian Kingdom in Warring States period. In 111 BC., the Han Dynasty established counties in Yunnan area, and Shilin belonged to Tangao county, Zangke Jun (another said Lügao County, Yizhou Jun). After Zhuge Liang marched to the south, Shilin was conquered and  still by governed by Tangao County, Jianning Jun. In the Southern Dynasties it was dominated by Cuanman clans, and in early Tang Dynasty it was under the jurisdiction of Quanma County and Longdi County in Nanning Prefecture. In Nanzhao and Dali period it was under the rule of Tuodong Jiedu and Shanchan Fu, later under Shicheng County. In 742, Salü City was built on Mount Xuedi in today's Shilin urban, which can be seen as the establishment of the county seat today. In 1255 Möngke Khan established Luomeng Wanhufu, and implemented tusi system here. In 1270, Luomeng and other two Wanhufu compounded to Middle Lu Zongguanfu. The Zongguanfu was separated to two Lu, Shilin was Lunan Zhou under Chengjiang Lu. Sani Qin clan is the tusi of Lunan Zhou. Lunan surrendered to Ming dynasty in 1382 and still by governed by Chengjiang Fu.

Administrative divisions 
Lufu Town, Shilin Town, Lumeiyi Town, Xijiekou Town, Changhu Town, Guishan Town, Banqiao Town and Dake Township.

Natural sites 
The Shilin (Stone Forest), a set of remarkable karst formations, is part of the South China Karst, inscribed in 2007 on the UNESCO World Heritage List. Dadieshui Waterfall is the largest waterfall in Yunnan province, located at the southwest of county urban.

Solarpower station
See also, Solar power in China

A large-scale solar power station in Shilin County had started construction on December 6, 2008. With a total installed capacity of 166 megawatts, the power station will be the largest experiment demonstration grid-connected solar photovoltaic power station in China.

Climate

References

External links 
 Shilin County Official Website 

County-level divisions of Kunming
Yi autonomous counties